This is a list of episodes from the Canadian cel-shaded animated series Dragon Booster. Dragon Booster was broadcast in 2004 to 2006 and ran for three seasons, each season containing thirteen twenty minute episodes.

Episodes

Season 1 (2004–05)

Season 2 (2005–06)

Season 3 (2006)

References
 TV.com summary of Dragon Booster
 http://www.dragon-city.org/chronicles.htm

Dragon Booster